Benjamin John Guintini (January 13, 1919 – December 2, 1998) was an American professional baseball outfielder. He briefly played in Major League Baseball (MLB) for the Pittsburgh Pirates (1946) and Philadelphia Athletics (1950). He went hitless in seven total MLB at bats.

A World War II veteran of the United States Army, he played more than 1,000 games in the minor leagues during his ten-season career (1940–1941; 1944–1951), and was named to the 1949 Texas League all-star team, a season during which Guintini reached a career high with 32 home runs. All told, Guintini hit 99 homers as a minor leaguer and played for five Pacific Coast League teams.

References

External links

1919 births
1998 deaths
Baltimore Orioles (IL) players
Baseball players from California
Dallas Eagles players
Fort Worth Cats players
Hollywood Stars players
Indianapolis Indians players
Los Banos, California
Major League Baseball outfielders
Oakland Oaks (baseball) players
People from Los Banos, California
Philadelphia Athletics players
Pittsburgh Pirates players
Salt Lake City Bees players
San Diego Padres (minor league) players
San Francisco Seals (baseball) players
United States Army personnel of World War II